Andrew Boesenecker is an American politician, pastor, and former music teacher serving as a member of the Colorado House of Representatives from the 53rd district. Boesenecker assumed office on April 28, 2021, succeeding Jennifer Arndt.

Early life and education 
Boesenecker was born in Holland, Michigan. Boesenecker earned a Bachelor of Music from Western Michigan University and a Master of Divinity from the Iliff School of Theology.

Career 
From 2001 to 2003, Boesenecker worked as an elementary school music teacher in Daytona Beach, Florida. From 2003 to 2009, he was the director of music for Cross Road Lutheran Church in Fleming Island, Florida. Boesenecker then moved to Fort Collins, Colorado, becoming the founding pastor and director of mission of the Mustard Seed House Churches. Since 2017, Boesenecker has been the director of annual giving and stewardship for the Semester at Sea program.

Boesenecker focus and campaigning is on affordable housing, access to behavioral and reproductive care, improvement of recreation sites, education and support for small businesses and workers.

In November 2022, Boesenecker was selected to serve as co-whip of the state House majority for the 2023 legislative session.

Personal life 
Boesenecker and his wife, Stacey, have three children and live in West Fort Collins, Colorado.

References 

Living people
Year of birth missing (living people)
People from Holland, Michigan
Western Michigan University alumni
People from Fort Collins, Colorado
Democratic Party members of the Colorado House of Representatives